Graeme Ramage (born 28 August 1992) is a former Scottish professional footballer and coach who played as a midfielder.

He has previously played in the Scottish Premier League for St Mirren, .

Career
Born in Alexandria, Ramage began his career with St Mirren and made his Scottish Premier League debut against Celtic in 2010, before signing with Dumbarton in July 2011.

On 4 July 2012, he signed a one-year contract for Annan Athletic. After suffering a knee injury in January 2013, he was then released by Annan at the end of the season.

On 5 March 2014, Ramage signed for Junior club Arthurlie before moving to Clydebank in July the same year. After spells with Shettleston and Yoker Athletic he joined Kello Rovers in 2016.

After a spell with Kirkintilloch Rob Roy, he signed for Cumnock Juniors in June 2019 before moving to Vale of Leven a few months later.

Ramage announced his retirement as a player on 1 October 2020.

Career statistics

References

1992 births
Living people
Scottish footballers
St Mirren F.C. players
Dumbarton F.C. players
East Stirlingshire F.C. players
Annan Athletic F.C. players
Arthurlie F.C. players
Clydebank F.C. (1965) players
Scottish Premier League players
Scottish Football League players
Scottish Junior Football Association players
Yoker Athletic F.C. players
Glasgow United F.C. players
Kello Rovers F.C. players
Association football midfielders
Kirkintilloch Rob Roy F.C. players
Cumnock Juniors F.C. players